CANT1 is a gene that encodes soluble calcium-activated nucleotidase 1, an enzyme, in humans.

References

External links

Further reading